The 2019 COSAFA U-20 Women's Championship was the first edition of the COSAFA U-20 Women's Championship, an international football tournament, for national women's under-20 teams organized by COSAFA. The tournament was played between August 1-11 in Nelson Mandela Bay, South Africa. Invited from CECAFA, Tanzania became champions after winning 2-1 over Zambia in the final.

Participants
Seven of the 14 nations in COSAFA was represented in this tournament, along with the invited CECAFA nation Tanzania. There was a late change in the line-up when Mozambique took Malawi's spot.

 (host)
 (guest)

Group stage
The 8 teams were on the 3rd of July, drawn into 2 groups and, played against each other once in a round-robin. The top two teams advanced to the semi-finals.

Group A

Group B

Knockout stage

Playoff-bracket

Semi-finals

Bronze medal game

Final

Top scorers

Source COSAFA.com

References

U-20
2019 in South African sport
International association football competitions hosted by South Africa
2019 in South African women's sport